A tactile alphabet is a system for writing material that the blind can read by touch. While currently the Braille system is the most popular and some materials have been prepared in Moon type, historically, many other tactile alphabets have existed:

Systems based on embossed Roman letters:
Moon type
Valentin Haüy's system (in italic style)
James Gall's "triangular alphabet", using both capital and lower-case, which was used in 1826 in the first embossed books published in English
Edmund Frye's system (capital letters only)
John Alston's system (capital letters only)
Jacob Snider, Jr.'s system, using rounded letters similar to Haüy's system, which was used in a publication of the Gospel of Mark in 1834, the first embossed book in the United States.
Samuel Gridley Howe's Boston Line using lowercase angular letters, influenced by Gall's system but more closely resembling standard Roman letters
Julius Reinhold Friedlander's Philadelphia Line, using all capital letters, similar to Alston's system, used at the Pennsylvania Institution for the Instruction of the Blind (now the Overbrook School for the Blind) in Philadelphia
William Chapin (also at the Pennsylvania Institution)'s system, combining the lowercase letters of the Boston Line with the capitals of the Philadelphia Line, forming the "combined system" (used by 1868 in books printed by N. B. Kneass, Jr.)
Elia Chepaitis's ELIA Frame tactile alphabet/font system includes the major characteristics of the Roman alphabet letter within a frame. The frame denotes where the letter begins and ends and allows for systematic exploration. The use of the Roman alphabet's features in the design helps previously sighted people learn it. And its similarities to standard Roman fonts helps sighted caregivers to learn and share the alphabet with people who have a visual impairment.
Systems based on arbitrary symbols:
Night writing
Braille
Thomas Lucas's system, based on shorthand and phonetic principles
James Hatley Frere's system, similar to Lucas's in that it was based on shorthand, but written in a boustrophedon manner
New York Point, a system of points invented by William Bell Wait, that competed with braille for some time before braille won out
Decapoint

See also Vibratese.

See also
Tactile graphic
Tangible symbol systems

External links
[Original from Columbia University Digitized Aug 18, 2009][GILBERT AND RIVINGTON, LD., ST JOHN'S HOUSE, CLERKENWELL ROAD, LONDON, E.C.]
A Critical Evaluation of the Historical Development of the Tactile Modes and Reading and an Analysis and Evaluation of Researches Carried out in Endeavors to make the Braille code Easier to Read and to Write
chapter 3: Early British Codes
 Virtual Exhibition "Signs - Books - Networks" of the German Museum of Books and Writing: Braille

http://abstracts.iovs.org/cgi/content/abstract/46/5/4590